Storm Front may refer to:
 Weather fronts

Film and TV
 Storm Front (Star Trek: Enterprise), a 2004 episode of Star Trek: Enterprise

Books
 Storm Front (The Dresden Files), a 2000 fantasy novel by Jim Butcher
 Storm Front, John Sandford
 Storm Front, novel ghostwritten for fictional TV character Richard Castle

Music
 Storm Front (quartet), the 2010 international champion barbershop quartet
 Storm Front (album), the eleventh studio album by Billy Joel

See also
 Stormfront (disambiguation)